The military rank of General in Mexico is divided into four categories:

-General Brigadier: equivalent to the Brigadier and between "Coronel" (Colonel) and "General de Brigada" (Brigade General).

-General de Brigada: Brigade General.

-General de Division: Divisional General.

-General Secretario de la Defensa Nacional: The highest military rank in the Mexican army - the "Secretary of Defense". The only person ranking higher is the President of Mexico.

See also
Army ranks and insignia of Mexico
Naval ranks and insignia of Mexico
Mexican Air Force#Ranks
Mexican Army#Ranks

Military ranks of Mexico